Solomon Bahiel ben Moses was the brother of Bahiel ben Moses; like his more famous brother, was also a physician and interpreter in the suite of King James I of Aragon. He was the author of the Arabic proclamation in which the Moors were notified of the conquest of Majorca and summoned to acknowledge their submission. In the Maimonidean controversy Solomon sided with his brother and joined the faction of Maimonides' supporters. He died in 1264. The "Confirmacion en Favor de Mosse hijo de Bahiel" and "á Favor de Salomon Bahiel," in regard to the legacy of Solomon Alfaquin, may perhaps refer to two sons of Solomon Bahiel. They are dated 3 Kalends April, 1264, and 6 Ides May, 1264.

Notes

Sources
Gottheil, Richard and Mayer Kayserling. "Bahiel". Jewish Encyclopedia. Funk and Wagnalls, 1901–1906; citing:
Kayserling, Gesch. der Juden in Spanien und Portugal, i. 160, 218;
Iggerot ha-Rambam, ed. Prag, pp. 34a, 35b;
Brüll, Jahrbücher, iv. 22;
Grätz, Gesch. der Juden, vii. 33, 57;
Jacobs, Sources, pp. 285, 286.

Medieval Jewish physicians of Spain
1264 deaths
13th-century people from the Kingdom of Aragon
13th-century Catalan Jews
Year of birth unknown